The 1964–65 Connecticut Huskies men's basketball team represented the University of Connecticut in the 1964–65 collegiate men's basketball season. The Huskies completed the season with a 23–3 overall record. The Huskies were members of the Yankee Conference, where they ended the season with a 10–0 record. They were the Yankee Conference Regular Season Champions and made it to the First Round in the 1965 NCAA Division I men's basketball tournament. The Huskies played their home games at Hugh S. Greer Field House in Storrs, Connecticut, and were led by second-year head coach Fred Shabel.

Schedule 

|-
!colspan=12 style=""| Regular Season

|-
!colspan=12 style=""| NCAA Tournament

Schedule Source:

References 

UConn Huskies men's basketball seasons
Connecticut
Connecticut
1964 in sports in Connecticut
1965 in sports in Connecticut